Youri Roulaux (born 19 May 1999) is a Dutch professional footballer who plays for Jong PSV as a goalkeeper.

Career
He signed for Roda JC Kerkrade on 1 September 2020. After one season, he rejoined Jong PSV, where he would also become a goalkeepers coach in the youth department.

References

1999 births
Living people
Dutch footballers
Jong PSV players
Roda JC Kerkrade players
Eerste Divisie players
Association football goalkeepers
People from Veldhoven
PSV Eindhoven players
PSV Eindhoven non-playing staff
VV UNA players